Gibbula aurantia is a species of sea snail, a marine gastropod mollusk in the family Trochidae, the top snails.

The name was introduced conditionally in Nordsieck & Talavera, 1979, but not available therefrom.

Description

Distribution
This species occurs in the Atlantic Ocean off Lanzarote in the Canary Islands.

References

 Nordsieck F. (1975). Conchiglie delle Isole Canarie. Parte 2.. La Conchiglia 75-76: 3-7, 22
 Nordsieck, F. & García-Talavera, F. (1979) Moluscos Marinos de Canarias y Madera (Gastropoda). Aula de Cultura, Tenerife, 208 pp., 46 pls. page(s): 50, pl. 8 fig. 12; note: there stated as "n. nov." for Gibbula tantilla Monterosato 
 Nordsieck, F. (1982) Die Europäischen Meeres-Gehäuseschnecken (Prosobranchia). Vom Eismeer bis Kapverden, Mittelmeer und Schwarzes Meer. 2., Völlig Neubearbeitete und Erweiterte Auflage. Gustav Fischer Verlag, Stuttgart, xii + 539 pp.
 Segers W., Swinnen F. & De Prins R., 2009. Marine Molluscs of Madeira. Snoeck Publishers, Heule, Belgium, 612 p. page(s): 69, pl. 7 fig. 1; note: supported as valid species

External links

aurantia
Gastropods described in 1975